Ana Belén Elgoyhen (born 13 December 1959) is an  Argentinian scientist, professor of pharmacology at the University of Buenos Aires and independent researcher of the National Scientific and Technical Research Council (Spanish: Consejo Nacional de Investigaciones Científicas y Técnicas, CONICET).

She is internationally recognized for her contributions to the understanding of the molecular basis of hearing (sense). Her work could be useful to treat auditory deficiencies and other hearing pathologies.

Biography 
Ana Belén Elgoyhen was born on 13 December 1959 in Buenos Aires, Argentina. In 1984 she graduated in biochemistry from the University of Buenos Aires. She received her PhD in biochemistry from the same university, under the supervision of Edda Adler de Graschinsky.

After being selected for the Pew Scholars Program in the Biomedical Sciences in 1991, Elgoyhen left Argentina to begin her post-doctoral studies in the laboratory of molecular neurobiology of the Institute Salk, California. In 1994,  Elgoyhen identified the receptors in the human ear that take part in the processes of modulation of the sounds and making them comprehensible. After her postdoctoral training, Elgoyhen returned to Argentina on 24 September 1994.

She was, between 1997 and 2011, International Scholar of the Howard Hughes Medical Institute and Fellow of John Simon Guggenheim Memorial Foundation between 2003 and 2004. She won in 2008 the L'Oreal-UNESCO Awards for Women in Science, which recognizes outstanding women scientists who have contributed to scientific progress for her contributions in the understanding of the fundamental molecular principles of the hearing. The others 2008 recipients were Lihadh Al-Gazali (United Arab Emirates), Elizabeth Blackburn (United States), V. Narry Kim (South Korea) and Ada Yonath (Israel).

In the 2012, the Argentinian vice-president Amado Boudou and the Argentinian minister of Science, Technology and Productive Innovation, Lino Barañao, awarded her the title of  2012 "Researcher of the Argentinian Nation" for her work on the genetics and physiology of the human ears.

Elgoyhen is working as superior researcher at the Institute of Investigations in Genetic Engineering and Molecular Biology "Dr. Héctor N. Torres", as adjunct professor of pharmacology in the Faculty of Medicine of the University of Buenos Aires since 2001, and as adjunct professor to the department of otorhinolaryngology of the School of Medicine of University Johns Hopkins since 2009.

Prizes and distinctions

References 

University of Buenos Aires alumni
1959 births
People from Buenos Aires
Johns Hopkins University faculty
Living people
L'Oréal-UNESCO Awards for Women in Science laureates
21st-century women scientists
TWAS laureates